Parasite Eve may refer to:

 Parasite Eve (novel), a 1995 Japanese science fiction horror novel by Hideaki Sena
 Parasite Eve (film), a 1997 Japanese science fiction film based on the novel
 Parasite Eve (video game), a 1998 action role-playing video game sequel to the novel
 "Parasite Eve" (song), a 2020 single by British rock band Bring Me the Horizon from their project Post Human